The 1993 Segunda División Peruana, the second division of Peruvian football (soccer), was played by 12 teams. the tournament winner, Ciclista Lima was promoted to the Primera División Peruana. The tournament was played on a home-and-away round-robin basis.

Results

Standings

External links
 RSSSF

Peruvian Segunda División seasons
Peru2
2